For information on all Stetson University sports, see Stetson Hatters

The Stetson Hatters football program is the intercollegiate American football team for Stetson University located in the U.S. state of Florida. The team competes in the NCAA Division I Football Championship Subdivision (FCS) and are members of the Pioneer Football League. Stetson's first football team was fielded in 1901, but the school dropped the sport in 1956 and did not reinstate it until 2013. The team plays its home games at the 6,000 seat Spec Martin Stadium in DeLand, Florida. The Hatters are coached by Brian Young.

History

A 7-game series between intramural teams from Stetson and Forbes occurred in 1894, the first football games in the state of Florida.  The first intercollegiate game between official varsity teams was played on November 22, 1901.  Stetson beat Florida Agricultural College at Lake City, one of the four forerunners of the University of Florida, 6-0, in a game played as part of the Jacksonville Fair. A sure score by FAC was obstructed by a tree stump. Stetson claims state titles in 1901, 1903, 1905, 1906, 1907, and 1909.

The Hatters participated in one bowl game, the 1952 Tangerine Bowl. They won 35–20 over Arkansas State.

After a 57-year hiatus, on August 31, 2013, Stetson revived their football program against Warner University (who were playing in their inaugural football game) at Spec Martin Stadium. The Hatters held a lead of 10-3 with 12:35 remaining in the 2nd quarter when the game was suspended due to lightning. After more than a two-hour delay, the game was officially postponed until the next day. On September 1, 2013, the game resumed, and Stetson won 31-3. It was Stetson's first win since defeating the University of Havana 64-0 at the end of the 1956 season.

On May 5, 2017, Donald Payne was signed as an undrafted free agent by the Baltimore Ravens. Though he would be cut, he would be picked up by the Jacksonville Jaguars, where he would become a star on special teams, becoming the first player from Stetson to play in the NFL. Payne spent two months on the injured reserve list at Jacksonville near the end of 2018, and was waived in May 2019. He would then sign with the Ravens in August 2019

Stetson finished their 2018 season 8–2, finishing second in the PFL and finishing with their first winning record since renewing the program.

Classifications
2013–present: NCAA Division I FCS

Conference memberships
1901–1925: Independent
1925–1931: Southern Intercollegiate Athletic Association
1932: Independent
1933–1940: Southern Intercollegiate Athletic Association
1941–1947: Independent
1948–1949: Dixie Conference
1950–1956: Independent
1957–2012: No team
2013–present: Pioneer Football League

Notable former players

Notable alumni include:

 Keith Shamrock - Owner of Shamrock Homes in Lake County, Florida (did the coin toss at the college's first football game after the football program was restarted)
 Donald Payne- LB, Washington Football Team
Thomas Weightman - Superintendent of Schools, Pasco County, Florida (1974–1996)
 Donald Parham - TE, Los Angeles Chargers

List of head coaches
Statistics correct as of February 2, 2021
The Hatters have had nine head coaches in over 50 seasons of (interrupted) play, with no play from 1917–1918, 1941–1945, and 1957–2012.

Bowl game appearances

Championships

Conference championships 
 SIAA Champs of Florida 1929

References

External links
 

 
1901 establishments in Florida
American football teams established in 1901